Independence is the name of several unincorporated communities in the U.S. state of West Virginia.

Independence, Barbour County, West Virginia
Independence, Clay County, West Virginia
Independence, Jackson County, West Virginia
Independence, Preston County, West Virginia